is a district of Shibuya, Tokyo, Japan.

As of October 2020, the population of this district is 9,499.

Education
 operates public elementary and junior high schools.

Tomigaya 1-chome, and Tomigaya 2-chome 1–9, 12–21, and 44-45-ban are zoned to Tomigaya Elementary School (富谷小学校). Tomigaya 2-chome 10-11 and 22-43-ban are zoned to Uehara Elementary School (上原小学校). All of Tomigaya (1 and 2-chome) is zoned to Uehara Junior High School (上原中学校).

The Yoyogi campus of Tokai University is located here.

References

Neighborhoods of Tokyo
Shibuya